The meridian 90° east of Greenwich is a line of longitude that extends from the North Pole across the Arctic Ocean, Asia, the Indian Ocean, the Southern Ocean, and Antarctica to the South Pole.

It is the border between two tropical cyclone basins: the Australian region, and the Southwest Indian Ocean basin.

The Ninety East Ridge is named after the meridian.

The 90th meridian east forms a great circle with the 90th meridian west.

This meridian is halfway between the Prime meridian and the 180th meridian and the center of the Eastern Hemisphere is on this meridian.

From Pole to Pole
Starting at the North Pole and heading south to the South Pole, the 90th meridian east passes through:

{| class="wikitable plainrowheaders"
! scope="col" width="120" | Co-ordinates
! scope="col" | Country, territory or sea
! scope="col" | Notes
|-
| style="background:#b0e0e6;" | 
! scope="row" style="background:#b0e0e6;" | Arctic Ocean
| style="background:#b0e0e6;" | Geographic North Pole
|-valign="top"
| style="background:#b0e0e6;" | 
! scope="row" style="background:#b0e0e6;" | Kara Sea
| style="background:#b0e0e6;" | Passing just west of Schmidt Island, Krasnoyarsk Krai, 
|-
| 
! scope="row" | 
| Krasnoyarsk Krai — Kirov Islands
|-
| style="background:#b0e0e6;" | 
! scope="row" style="background:#b0e0e6;" | Kara Sea
| style="background:#b0e0e6;" |
|-valign="top"
| 
! scope="row" | 
| Krasnoyarsk Krai Republic of Khakassia — from  Tuva Republic — from 
|-
| 
! scope="row" | 
| Bayan-Ölgii Province
|-valign="top"
| 
! scope="row" |  
| Xinjiang  Qinghai — from  Tibet — from 
|-
| 
! scope="row" | 
|
|-valign="top"
| 
! scope="row" | 
| Assam - passing just east of Dhubri Meghalaya — from 
|-
| 
! scope="row" | 
|
|-
| style="background:#b0e0e6;" | 
! scope="row" style="background:#b0e0e6;" | Indian Ocean
| style="background:#b0e0e6;" |
|-
| style="background:#b0e0e6;" | 
! scope="row" style="background:#b0e0e6;" | Southern Ocean
| style="background:#b0e0e6;" |
|-
| 
! scope="row" | Antarctica
| Kaiser Wilhelm II Land, Australian Antarctic Territory, claimed by 
|-
| style="background:#b0e0e6;" | 
! scope="row | Antarctica
|style="background:#b0e0e6;" | Geographic South Pole
|-
|}

See also
45×90 points

e090 meridian east